Green anarchism, also known as eco-anarchism, is an anarchist school of thought that puts a particular emphasis on ecology and environmental issues. A green anarchist theory is normally one that extends anarchism beyond a critique of human interactions and includes a critique of the interactions between humans and non-humans as well. Beyond human liberation, green anarchist praxis can extend to some form of non-human, total liberation and an environmentally sustainable anarchist society.

The main tendencies of green anarchism are: social ecology, which argues that environmental issues stem directly from social issues; deep ecology, which critiques anthropocentrism and advocates instead for biocentrism; and anarcho-primitivism, which advocates for the abolition of technology and civilization.

History
The ecological roots of anarchism go back to the classical anarchists, with Pierre-Joseph Proudhon and Mikhail Bakunin both conceiving of human nature as the basis for anarchism, while Peter Kropotkin elaborated on the natural basis for communism in his book Mutual Aid: A Factor of Evolution. But the emergence of a green anarchism did not take place until the Atomic Age, as increasingly centralized governments brought with them a host of environmental and social issues. By the 1960s, as the threats presented by environmental degradation, industrial agriculture and pollution were becoming more urgent, the first green anarchists turned to decentralisation and diversity as solutions for socio-ecological systems.

Green anarchism as a tendency was pioneered by Murray Bookchin, whose theory of social ecology presented an analysis for the relationship between society and nature. He presented human society as both the cause of and solution to environmental degradation, envisioning the creation of a rational and ecological society through a process of sociocultural evolution. Bookchin saw society itself as a natural product of evolution, which intrinsically tended toward ever-increasing complexity and diversity. While he saw human society as having the potential to become "nature  rendered self-conscious", in The Ecology of Freedom, he elaborated that the emergence of hierarchy had given way to an "aberrant" form of society that was both ecologically and socially destructive. 

Bookchin considered that the human desire to dominate other humans had preceded the human desire to dominate nature, which itself caused a vicious circle of increasing socio-ecological devastation. As he considered social hierarchy to go against the natural evolutionary principles of complexity and diversity, he resolved that it would have to be abolished in order to resolve ecological crisis. Bookchin thus proposed a decentralised system of direct democracy, centred locally in the municipality, where people themselves could participate in decision making. He envisioned a self-organized system of popular assemblies to replace the state and re-educate individuals into socially and ecologically-minded citizens.

During the 1970s, another tendency of green anarchism emerged that stood in contrast to social ecology. Developed by Arne Næss, the theory of deep ecology posited the rejection of anthropocentrism in favour of biocentrism, which recognized the intrinsic value of all life, regardless of its utility to humankind. Unlike Bookchin, theorists of deep ecology considered human society to be incapable of reversing environmental degradation and, as a result, proposed a drastic reduction in world population. The solutions to human overpopulation proposed by deep ecologists included bioregionalism, which advocated the replacement of the nation state with bioregions, as well as a widespread return to a hunter-gatherer lifestyle. The deep ecological approach was taken up by Earth First!, a group which advocated for direct action against environmentally destructive projects, such as deforestation, and welcomed the mass death caused by disease and famine as a form of population control. 

Following deep ecology, the main development in green anarchism was John Zerzan's conception of anarcho-primitivism, which criticised the emergence of technology, agriculture and civilization as the source of all social problems. According to Zerzan, it was the division of labour in agricultural societies that had first given way to the social inequality and alienation which became characteristic of modernity. As such, Zerzan proposed the abolition of technology and science, in order for society to be broken down and humans to return to a hunter-gather lifestyle.

Contemporary developments 
Contemporary writers such as Murray Bookchin and Alan Carter have claimed anarchism to be the only political ideology capable of addressing climate change.

Direct action 

Some green anarchists engage in direct action (not to be confused with ecoterrorism). Organizing themselves through groups like Earth First!, Root Force, or more drastically the Earth Liberation Front ELF, Earth Liberation Army (ELA) and Animal Liberation Front (ALF). They may take direct action against what they see as systems of oppression, such as the logging industry, the meat and dairy industries, animal testing laboratories, genetic engineering facilities and, more rarely, government institutions.

Eco-anarchist actions have included violent attacks, such as those carried out by cells of the Informal Anarchist Federation (IAF) and Individualists Tending to the Wild (ITS) against nuclear scientists and nanotechnology researchers respectively.

See also 

 Animal rights and punk subculture
 Chellis Glendinning
 Earth Liberation Front
 Earth First!
 Green Scare
 Eco-socialism
 Intentional community
 Left-libertarianism
 Operation Backfire (FBI)
 Permaculture

References

Bibliography

Further reading

External links 
 The Institute for Social Ecology.
 Articles tagged with "green" and "ecology" at The Anarchist Library.
 Green Anarchy.
 REWILD.info .
 Primitivism.
 Tiamat Publications .
 The News from Nowhere. Practical Green Anarchist ideas and theory.
 "A.3.3 What kinds of green anarchism are there?"  in An Anarchist FAQ.

 
Anarchist schools of thought
Animal Liberation Front
Animal rights and politics
Animal rights movement
Animal welfare
Earth Liberation Front
Green anarchists
Green politics
Political theories
Simple living